ICON is a compilation album by the Canadian-Ukrainian singer-songwriter Luba. It is the first release by Luba for 14 years. ICON is a compilation of previously released songs, as well as a new track, Heaven, which was presented on Luba's MySpace around 2007. The album has been released by Universal Music Canada.

Track listing
Let It Go  (European Single Version) - appears on Secrets and Sins
Giving Away A Miracle - appears on All or Nothing
When A Man Loves A Woman (Live) - appears on Over 60 Minutes with Luba
Everytime I See Your Picture - appears on Secrets and Sins and Luba (EP)
Is She A Lot Like Me - appears on From The Bitter To The Sweet
Storm Before The Calm - appears on Secrets and Sins
Innocent (With An Explanation) - appears on Between The Earth & Sky
Little Salvation - appears on All or Nothing
How Many - appears on Between The Earth & Sky
No More Words - appears on All or Nothing
Heaven - previously unreleased, previewed on Luba's MySpace page
Let It Go (Acoustic Version) - appears on On Tour (EP)

External links
 Official Luba Website
 Luba at canoe.ca
 Luba on MySpace

2014 compilation albums
Luba (singer) albums